= All Shades of Iberibe =

2021 collection of short stories by Kasimma

- First edition
- Author: Kasimma
- Cover artist: Karo Akpokiere
- Language: English
- Genre: Literary fiction anthology
- Set in: Nigeria
- Publisher: Sandorf Passage
- Publication date: November 2, 2021
- Publication place: Nigeria
- Media type: Print, ebook
- Pages: 368
- ISBN: 9781982102579

All Shades of Iberibe is a collection of short stories by Nigerian author Kasimma. It was first published by Sandorf Passage 2021.
